"Singing in the Rain" is a song by Canadian rock band Simple Plan from their fifth studio album, Taking One for the Team (2016). On the album, American musical duo Rock City are featured on the track, with an additional verse written by the duo's Timothy and Theron Thomas, however the single version does not include this feature. The solo Simple Plan version of "Singing in the Rain" was released to digital retailers on March 25, 2016 as the album's third official single.

Music video
The accompanying music video was directed by Mark Staubach and pays homage to the 1996 film, That Thing You Do!. It premiered April 12, 2016. Set in 1964, the video seeks to depict the positive and negative aspects of the life of a musician, and "the exhilarating power that 3 chords, a drum beat and a catchy melody can have on the lives of the people who create it," according to a statement from the band.

Track listings

Credits and personnel
Credits are adapted from the digital liner notes at AllMusic.

Chart performance

Release history

Notes

References

2015 songs
2016 singles
Atlantic Records singles
Simple Plan songs
Song recordings produced by Howard Benson
Songs written by Chuck Comeau
Songs written by Pierre Bouvier